USS Block Island (CVE-8) (originally AVG and then ACV) was an  escort aircraft carrier that served during World War II.

The ship was laid down on 15 May 1941 as Mormacpenn under Maritime Commission contract at Pascagoula, Mississippi, by Ingalls Shipbuilding, acquired by the United States Navy on 9 January 1943 and simultaneously transferred via the Lend-Lease program to the United Kingdom as Trailer. On 11 January 1943, the ship was renamed HMS Hunter (D80) and commissioned by the Royal Navy. In March 1945 was attached to the 21st Aircraft Carrier Squadron. She participated in Operation Jurist and Operation Tiderace in August 1945, the reoccupation of Malaya and Singapore from the Japanese.

The vessel was returned to United States' custody 29 December 1945 and sold into merchant service on 17 January 1947 as Almdijk. In October 1965 the ship was sold for scrapping in Spain.

Design and description
There were eight s in service with the Royal Navy during the Second World War. They were built between 1941 and 1942 by Ingalls Shipbuilding and Western Pipe & Steel shipyards in the United States, both building four ships each.

The ships had a complement of 646 men and crew accommodation was different from the normal Royal Navy's arrangements. The separate messes no longer had to prepare their own food, as everything was cooked in the galley and served cafeteria style in a central dining area. They were also equipped with a modern laundry and a barber shop. The traditional hammocks were replaced by three tier bunk beds, eighteen to a cabin which were hinged and could be tied up to provide extra space when not in use.

Aircraft facilities were a small combined bridge–flight control on the starboard side and above the  flight deck, two aircraft lifts , and nine arrestor wires. Aircraft could be housed in the  hangar below the flight deck. Armament comprised two 4"/50, 5"/38 or 5"/51 in single mounts, eight 40 mm anti-aircraft guns in twin mounts and twenty-one 20 mm anti-aircraft cannon in single or twin mounts. They had the capacity for up to eighteen aircraft which could be a mixture of Grumman Martlet, Hawker Sea Hurricane, Vought F4U Corsair fighter aircraft and Fairey Swordfish or Grumman Avenger anti-submarine aircraft.

References

Bibliography

External links

 

Type C3-S-A1 ships of the Royal Navy
Attacker-class escort carriers
Ships built in Pascagoula, Mississippi
1942 ships
World War II aircraft carriers of the United Kingdom